Río Prieto is a barrio in the municipality of Lares, Puerto Rico. Its population in 2010 was 567.

History
The United States acquired Puerto Rico from Spain in the aftermath of the Spanish–American War under the terms of the Treaty of Paris of 1898. In 1899, the United States conducted its first census of Puerto Rico finding that the population of Río Prieto barrio was 1,931.

Sectors
Barrios (which are roughly comparable to minor civil divisions) and subbarrios, in turn, are further subdivided into smaller local populated place areas/units called sectores (sectors in English). The types of sectores may vary, from normally sector to urbanización to reparto to barriada to residencial, among others.

The following sectors are in Río Prieto barrio:

 and 
.

See also

 List of communities in Puerto Rico
 List of barrios and sectors of Lares, Puerto Rico

References

Barrios of Lares, Puerto Rico